Grumentum was an ancient Roman city in the centre of Lucania, in what is now the comune of Grumento Nova, c.  south of Potenza by the direct road through Anxia, and  by the Via Herculia, at the point of divergence of a road eastward to Heraclea.

The main public buildings of the city have been excavated and are in excellent condition.

History

The first Lucanian settlements in the area date from the 6th century BC. The site was founded by the Romans in the 3rd century BC during the Samnite Wars as a fortified vanguard. The position was chosen to control important routes (one of which became the via Herculia in the late 200s AD). In 215 BC the Carthaginian general Hanno was defeated under its walls at the Battle of Grumentum, but in 207 BC Hannibal made it his headquarters.

In the Social War it was a strong fortress, and seems to have been held by both sides at different times but was sacked by Italic tribes. It became a colony, perhaps in the time of Sulla, at the latest under Augustus, and became important.

St. Laverius was martyred here in 312 AD. In 370 AD Grumentum became a bishopric but soon afterwards it began to be abandoned. Due to the Saracen inroads (9th–10th centuries), in 954 a new town (Saponara or Saponaria, the modern Grumento Nova) was founded.

The Site

Its ruins include those of a large amphitheatre (arena 62.5 m x 60 m, 1st century BC), the only one in Lucania. There are also remains of a theatre. Inscriptions record the repair of its town walls and the construction of thermae (of which remains were found) in 57–51 BC, the construction in 43 BC, of a portico, remains of which may be seen along an ancient road, at right angles to the main road, which traversed Grumentum from south to north. A domus with 4th century mosaics is also present, as well as two small temples of imperial times. Outside the walls monumental tombs, a Palaeo-Christian basilica and an aqueduct have been found.

The aqueduct had its source about 5 km further south and entered the town on the southern side of the plateau. It was transported on arches and emptied into a Castellum Aquae of which some ruins remain.

Many of the finds can be seen in the Archaeological Museum of Grumento Nova.

Notes

References

External links
Information about Grumentum given by the Agenzia di Promozione Territoriale di Basilicata
Information about the Museo Archeologico Nazionale dell’Alta Val d’Agri di Grumento Nova given by the Agenzia di Promozione Territoriale di Basilicata
Official website of the Museo Archeologico Nazionale dell’Alta Val d’Agri di Grumento Nova 
Description of Grumentum on the website of the Parco Nazionale dell'Appennino Lucano Val d'Agri – Lagonegrese 
Photos of Grumentum

Roman sites of Basilicata
Former populated places in Italy
Archaeological sites in Basilicata